The men's 400 metres hurdles was an event at the 1996 Summer Olympics in Atlanta, Georgia. There were 55 competitors from 35 nations. The maximum number of athletes per nation had been set at 3 since the 1930 Olympic Congress. The event was won by Derrick Adkins of the United States, the nation's fourth consecutive and 16th overall victory in the event. Samuel Matete of Zambia earned that nation's first medal in the event with his silver. American Calvin Davis took bronze.

Background

This was the 21st time the event was held. It had been introduced along with the men's 200 metres hurdles in 1900, with the 200 being dropped after 1904 and the 400 being held through 1908 before being left off the 1912 programme. However, when the Olympics returned in 1920 after World War I, the men's 400 metres hurdles was back and would continue to be contested at every Games thereafter.

One of the eight finalists from the 1992 Games returned: silver medalist (and 1988 finalist) Winthrop Graham of Jamaica. Samuel Matete of Zambia, the favorite in 1992 before a hamstring injury kept him out of the final, was favored again after adding two World Championship silver medals (1993 and 1995) to his 1991 victory. American Derrick Adkins had won the 1995 World Championship and was also a serious contender.

Guyana, Latvia, Mauritius, Moldova, Panama, Qatar, Russia, Slovakia, Slovenia, and Zimbabwe each made their debut in the event. The United States made its 20th appearance, most of any nation, having missed only the boycotted 1980 Games.

Competition format

The competition used the three-round format used every Games since 1908 (except the four-round competition in 1952): quarterfinals, semifinals, and a final. Ten sets of hurdles were set on the course. The hurdles were 3 feet (91.5 centimetres) tall and were placed 35 metres apart beginning 45 metres from the starting line, resulting in a 40 metres home stretch after the last hurdle. The 400 metres track was standard.

There were 7 quarterfinal heats with 7 or 8 athletes each. The top 2 men in each quarterfinal advanced to the semifinals along with the next fastest 2 overall. The 16 semifinalists were divided into 2 semifinals of 8 athletes each, with the top 4 in each semifinal advancing to the 8-man final.

Records

These were the standing world and Olympic records (in seconds) prior to the 1996 Summer Olympics.

No new world or Olympic records were set during the competition.

Schedule

All times are Eastern Daylight Time (UTC-4)

Results

Quarterfinals

Quarterfinal 1

Quarterfinal 2

Quarterfinal 3

Quarterfinal 4

Quarterfinal 5

Quarterfinal 6

Quarterfinal 7

Semifinals

Semifinal 1

Semifinal 2

Final

Results summary

See also
 1993 Men's World Championships 400m Hurdles (Stuttgart)
 1994 Men's European Championships 400m Hurdles (Helsinki)
 1995 Men's World Championships 400m Hurdles (Gothenburg)
 1997 Men's World Championships 400m Hurdles (Athens)
 1998 Men's European Championships 400m Hurdles (Budapest)
 1999 Men's World Championships 400m Hurdles (Seville)

References

External links
 Official Report
 Results

H
400 metres hurdles at the Olympics
Men's events at the 1996 Summer Olympics